Palais des Sports Robert Oubron is an indoor sporting arena located in Créteil, France.  The capacity of the arena is 2,500 people.  It is currently home to the US Créteil Handball team handball team.

Handball venues in France
Indoor arenas in France
Créteil
Sports venues in Val-de-Marne